Wadner Bholji is a village located in the Nandura tehsil of Buldhana district in Amravati division of Vidarbha region of Maharashtra state in India.

 India census, Wadner had a population of 10445.

It is located on National Highway No. 6 running between Nagpur Mumbai.

Notes 

Villages in Buldhana district

pincode -443101